Nasser Abufarha is a Palestinian-American anthropologist and social entrepreneur. He is the founder of Canaan Fair Trade and the Palestine Fair Trade Association—a network of small-scale family farms organized under fair trade and organic production, active in 54 villages across the West Bank with 1500 members.

His book, The Making of a Human Bomb: An Ethnography of Palestinian Resistance, was published by Duke University Press in 2009.

Early life and education
He was born in 1964 in Al-Jalama, a small farming village near Jenin, at the northern tip of the West Bank. He currently lives in his village in Palestine.

After first studying in Canada, he traveled to the United States, where he earned his bachelor's degree in Computer Science from Wayne State University in 1989. Abufarha went on to earn a PhD in Cultural Anthropology, Urban and Regional Planning from the University of Wisconsin–Madison in 2006.

Career
In 2004, Abufarha established the Palestine Fair Trade Association—a network of small-scale family farms organized under fair trade and organic production, active in 54 villages across the West Bank with 1500 members.

He also established Canaan Fair Trade, a healthy lifestyle brand of Palestinian speciality foods selling to the United States and Europe. Canaan Palestine products are certified fair trade and organic offering Palestinian olive oil.

Publications
The Making of a Human Bomb: An Ethnography of Palestinian Resistance. Duke University Press, 2009.
 Book Chapter: Alternative Palestinian Agenda. in Palestinian-Israeli Impasse: Exploring Alternative Solutions to the Palestinian-Israeli Conflict. Mahdi Abdelhadi, Editor. Palestinian Academic Society for the Study of International Affairs (PASSIA), Jerusalem 2005.
 Alternative Trade Organizations and the Fair Trade Movement. Social Research: For A Better World. Issue 6, Spring (2013).
 Suicide, Violence, and Cultural Conceptions of Martyrdom in Palestine. Social Research: An International Quarterly of social Research. Neil Whitehead and Nasser Abufarha (2008).
 Land of Symbols: Cactus, poppies, Orange, and Olive Trees in Palestine. (6-2008) Identities: Global Studies in Culture and Power. Vol. 15.
 Bi-nationalism in Palestine-Israel: A Palestinian Historical Choice, Not a Last Resort. Shu’on Tnmawayeh (Journal of Development Affairs), June 2005, Al Multaqa (Arab Thought Forum) – Jerusalem.
 Bird's Labor Mirrors Palestinian Struggle, July 2001. Capital Times, Madison. Newspaper article.

Awards
 One World Award, IFOAM Organics, Germany, October 2017.
 Palestine Exporter of the Year Award, Paltrade & Ministry of Economy, Palestine 2016.
 Premio Verde Award, The Navarro Foundation, Madrid, Spain, November 2015.
 Leadership Award, Citizenship Category. The Speciality Food Association, USA. Jan 2013.
 Inspiration of Hope Award. Interfaith Peace Builders. Chicago, USA. December 2010.

References
 Profile of Nasser Abufarha at the Institute for Middle East Understanding
 Palestine Fair Trade Association - About Us
 Palcast: Nasser Abufarha on Fair Trade/Organic in Palestine
 Nasser Abufarha: Bi-Nationalism in Palestine-Israel at Znet.org
 Leadership Award, Citizenship Category.
 Palestine Exporter of the Year Award
 One World Award
 Canaan Palestine, Nasser Abufarha : A Growing Seed 
 Leader of the fair trade movement in Palestine to speak in Santa Cruz
 Reshaping Olive Industry to Boost Palestinian Economy.

External links
 Nasser Abufraha Linked in Profile
 Terroir Talk - Nasser Abufarha

1964 births
Living people
University of Wisconsin–Madison College of Letters and Science alumni
American people of Palestinian descent
20th-century American businesspeople